Georges Heuyer  (30 January 1884 in Pacy-sur-Eure – 23 October 1977 in Paris) was a physician and  child psychiatrist in France, who was appointed to the first chair of child psychiatry in Europe.

Biography 
He was the son of Louis Heuyer (1847–1930), a military medical officer. he died at the age of 93, was married three times, and raised eight children including three from his last wife, Suzanne Le Garrec, who married him in 1944.

Georges Heuyer defended his thesis for his doctorate of medicine in 1914, from which he obtained the silver medal, under the supervision of Professor Ernest Dupré.

Although not a psychoanalyst himself, he introduced the practice of psychoanalysis in a hospital environment, first with the Freudian analyst Eugénie Sokolnicka (whom he met thanks to the novelist Paul Bourget), then with Sophie Morgenstern to whom he entrusted a psychoanalysis laboratory.

In 1925, he was a co-founder, with Jadwiga Abramson, of the Clinic of Pediatric Neuro-Psychiatry in Paris. Heuyer wrote extensively on child psychiatry (ten books and more than one hundred publications).

Publications
 Enfants anormaux et délinquants juvéniles. Nécessité de l'examen psychiatrique des écoliers, 1914 
 Assistance aux enfants anormaux. Création d'une consultation de neuro-psychiatrie infantile, 1925 
 Georges Heuyer, Claudia-Henriette Petot. Tétanos guéri par des injections massives de sérum anti-tétanique, 1926 
 Georges Heuyer, J. J. Gournay. Luxations congénitales multiples, 1926 |
 G. Heuyer, J. Longchampt. Considérations sur les convulsions essentielles de l'enfance et spasmophilie, 1928 
 Conditions de santé à envisager au point de vue du mariage dans les maladies mentales et nerveuses et les intoxications, 1928 
 Les Bourreaux domestiques, 1928
 Les Troubles du Sommeil chez l'enfant, 1928
 Le Surmenage dans l'enseignement primaire, 1930
 L'Hygiène mentale de l'enfant aux États-Unis, 1930
 La Sélection des anormaux psychiques à l'école aux États-Unis. Le service de Child guidance de Newark, 1931
 Les Principes de neuro-psychiatrie infantile, 1931
 Georges Heuyer, Jadwiga Abramson. Le Profil mental dans l'examen des jeunes délinquants, Le Profil mental dans l'examen des jeunes délinquants, 1931
 A. Rodiet, Georges Heuyer. La Folie au XXe. Étude médico-sociale, 1931
 Psychoses et crimes passionnels, 1932
 Alexandre Lamache, Georges Heuyer. Le Mentisme, 1930 
  Georges Heuyer, Sophie Morgenstern. La Psychanalyse infantile et son rôle dans l'hygiène mentale, 1933
 Georges Heuyer, Louis Le Guillant. De quelques toxicomanies nouvelles, 1933
 Claire Vogt-Popp, Jenny Roudinesco, Georges Heuyer. Spasmes toniques du cou avec troubles spasmodiques de la parole entraînant l'aphonie, 1934
 Georges Heuyer, J. Feld. Amyotrophie sclérosante généralisée progressive, 1940
 Georges Heuyer, Dr. Combes. Hématomyélie par éclatement de bombe, 1941
 Narco-analyse et narco-diagnostic : histoire d'un procès, L'expansion scientifique française, 1949
 Introduction à la psychologie infantile, 1949, PUF ; 3e ed. 1969.
 Esquisse d'une psychopathologie des jeunes adultes, 1956, in l'Évolution psychiatrique, 2007, n° 72, ISSN 0014-3855
 Vingt leçons de psychologie médicale, 1966, PUF
 Les Troubles mentaux : étude criminologique, 1968, PUF
 Introduction à la psychiatrie infantile, 1969, PUF
 La Délinquance juvénile : étude psychiatrique, 1969, PUF
 La Schizophrénie, 1974, PUF
 Cyrille Koupernik, Robert Dailly, Georges Heuyer, M. Ribaillier. Développement neuro-psychique du nourrisson : Sémiologie normale et pathologique, 1976.

References

Notes 

1884 births
1977 deaths
Commandeurs of the Légion d'honneur
French psychiatrists